Love in Paris (released as Another  Weeks in the United States) is a 1997 American erotic romantic drama film. It is a sequel to the 1986 film  Weeks.

Mickey Rourke stars, reprising his original role as John Gray. Angie Everhart co-stars. This sequel was directed by Anne Goursaud and was released directly to video in the United States, receiving poor reviews.

Plot
Ten years after Elizabeth (the character portrayed by Kim Basinger in the first film) left him, John has descended into a world of depression and loneliness, and is suicidal. When he receives an invitation to attend an art exhibit in Paris that will feature some of Elizabeth's paintings, he immediately boards a plane for France, hoping to get to talk to her.

He arrives at the auction house and promptly wins all of her artwork, but Elizabeth is not there. He does, however, see a beautiful woman (Angie Everhart) wearing exactly the same shawl that he gave to Elizabeth many years earlier. The woman's name is Lea Calot. She says that she is Elizabeth's close friend and that Elizabeth is now living in another country, happily married.

John suspects there is something Lea is not telling him. It becomes apparent that Elizabeth told her intimate details of their relationship. Lea, a fashion designer, is obviously attracted to John, and he begins to warm to her as well. They begin a passionate affair, but Lea continues to be evasive when it comes to answering questions about Elizabeth.

John also becomes close to Lea's beautiful assistant, Claire, who is in an abusive relationship with her boyfriend. As John comes closer to discovering the truth of Elizabeth's fate, he is forced to examine the ways in which his past actions have changed him as a person, and if he can be the kind of lover for Lea that she wants him to be.

Cast

 Mickey Rourke as John Gray
 Agathe de La Fontaine as Claire
 Angie Everhart as Lea Calot
 Steven Berkoff as Vitorio DaSilva
 Dougray Scott as Charlie

References

External links
 
 
 

1997 direct-to-video films
1997 films
French romantic drama films
British romantic drama films
Erotic romance films
Films set in Paris
Direct-to-video sequel films
English-language French films
1990s English-language films
Films directed by Anne Goursaud
1990s British films
1990s French films